Mydaea is a large genus from the fly family Muscidae.

Species List
M. affinis Meade, 1891
M. ancilla (Meigen, 1826)
M. anicula (Zetterstedt, 1860)
M. armatipes Malloch, 1921
M. brevipilosa Malloch, 1920
M. canescens Huckett, 1965
M. corni (Scopoli, 1763)
M. cresa Snyder, 1949
M. deserta (Zetterstedt, 1845)
M. discimanoides Snyder, 1949
M. electa (Zetterstedt, 1860)
M. flavicornis Coquillett, 1902
M. fulvicrura (Huckett, 1965)
M. fumipennis (Wulp, 1896)
M. furtiva Stein, 1920
M. fuscomarginata (Malloch, 1919)
M. grata Huckett, 1973
M. hirtiventris Malloch, 1920
M. humeralis Robineau-Desvoidy, 1830
M. impedita Stein, 1920
M. insons (Giglio-tos, 1893)
M. laevis (Huckett, 1965)
M. lateritia (Rondani, 1866)
M. longuseta (Wulp, 1896)
M. maculipennis (Huckett, 1966)
M. maculiventris (Zetterstedt, 1846)
M. micans Ringdahl, 1936
M. narona Snyder, 1949
M. nebulosa (Stein, 1893)
M. neglecta Malloch, 1920
M. neobscura Snyder, 1949
M. nitidiventris (Ringdahl, 1934)
M. nubila Stein, 1916
M. nudiseta Stein, 1920
M. obscurella Malloch, 1921
M. occidentalis Malloch, 1920
M. orthonevra (Macquart, 1835)
M. otiosa Stein, 1920
M. palpalis Stein, 1916
M. pansa (Giglio-tos, 1893)
M. plaumanni Snyder, 1941
M. pogonoides (Snyder, 1949)
M. pseudonubila Huckett, 1965
M. rufinervis (Pokorny, 1889)
M. setifemur Ringdahl, 1924
M. setitibia (Huckett, 1965)
M. sootryeni Ringdahl, 1928
M. urbana (Meigen, 1826)
M. winnemana Malloch, 1919

References

Muscidae
Diptera of North America
Diptera of Europe
Brachycera genera
Taxa named by Jean-Baptiste Robineau-Desvoidy